The 2011 West Bengal alcohol poisonings killed 167 people in December 2011 in the eastern Indian state of West Bengal after consumption of spurious liquor mixed with methanol (methyl alcohol).

See also
Alcohol prohibition in India
List of alcohol poisonings in India

References 

Alcohol-related deaths in India
2011 disasters in India
Crime in West Bengal
December 2011 events in India